Francisco Dantas is a municipality in the state of Rio Grande do Norte in the Northeast region of Brazil.

See also
List of municipalities in Rio Grande do Norte

References

Municipalities in Rio Grande do Norte